Shirley Anne Clelland (born 1951), is a female former athlete who competed for England.

Athletics career
She represented England in the pentathlon, at the 1970 British Commonwealth Games in Edinburgh, Scotland.

References

1951 births
English female athletes
Athletes (track and field) at the 1970 British Commonwealth Games
Living people
British pentathletes
Commonwealth Games competitors for England